The Quaestor at the University of St Andrews, in Scotland, is a senior executive, and is responsible for the finances of the University; the equivalent of treasurer, Finance Director, or chief operating officer in other institutions. The Quaestor is also the Factor of the University.

The Quaestor is a member of the Office of the Principal, and work under the direction of the Principal of the University of St Andrews, who is chief executive of the University.

The Quaestor and Factor, as of 14 April 2017, was Derek Watson FFCA.

References

See also
 Governance of the University of St Andrews

University of St Andrews